Rinchan was a ruler of  Kashmir from 1320 to 1323. Originally said to have been a Ladakhi Buddhist, he converted to Islam, becoming the first Muslim ruler of Kashmir. He was known as Sultan Sadr-ud-Din after his conversion to Islam.

Background 
Around 1313, an invader named "Du'l-Qadr"—mentioned by Jonaraja to be the commander of a Karmasena—invaded Kashmir with heavy cavalry. Baharistan-i-shahi (BIS; anon.) notes him to be a Turko-Mongol raider; the name is given as "Zulchu".

Jonaraja notes that Suhadeva, the-then ruler of Kashmir to have had received him with all honors; he sought to pay his way out of a conflict and levied new taxes on all subjects. This did not go down well with the Brahmins who threatened to fast until death, bringing Suhadeva's plans to an end and spurring the inevitable. In contrast, BIS does not mention any negotiation — the sole aim was said to be to massacre Kashmiris and gain wealth.

Biography

Early life 
Little is known about the antecedents of Rinchan. While BIS claims him to have arrived from "Tibet", Jonaraja says that he was a Ladakhi nobleman of Buddhist faith whose father and other relatives were treacherously murdered at the hands of Kalamanya (probably Balti) clan. Rinchan took his revenge by feigning to make peace with the Kalamanyas, lured them unarmed to drink the chalice at a river-bank and had them murdered with a hidden axe. Despite this success, there were ample adversaries left in Ladakh, and he chose to ply his trade in North Kashmir.

Ascension to Power 
Rinchan was allowed to reside at Gaganagiri by Ramchandra, Governor of Lahara and began to ascend the hierarchy of power; Suhadeva allowed this with the aim of keeping Ramchandra in check. Before long, Rinchan had gained tremendous wealth by selling off Kashmiris as slaves to Ladakh — this trade ran in parallel to Qadr's depredations and did not draw any imperial response. By the time, Qadr decided to return (Jonaraja blames the impending winters whereas BIS blames the lack of food), Kashmir was in a state of total ruin with the elites dead or distant; Suhadeva lacked popular legitimacy and Rinchan had his eyes set on the throne.

That the people were allowed to form armed groups to ward off robbers etc. helped Rinchan; he utilized the loopholes to raise a group of faithful soldiers in Lahar. However, Ramchandra proved to be a hard obstacle to his machinations and Rinchan had him assassinated by sneaking in fellow Ladakhis into Lahara Fort as cloth-merchants over the course of days. The fort was seized, his relatives imprisoned, and Kota—the daughter of Ramchandra—married to Rinchan himself, by force.

According to Jonaraja, there was none left to oppose Rinchan's rise to power, Suhadeva fled Kashmir; however, BIS notes of a battle where Suhadeva was defeated.

Rule and conversion 
Both Jonaraja and BIS commend Rinchan to be a kind and just ruler. The rule of law was sacrosanct for everybody irrespective of closeness to the King and his sagacious ways led subjects to believe that the Golden Age of Kashmir had been restored. Shah Mir was appointed as the Prime Minister.

Jonaraja notes that soon after his ascension, Rinchan had sought initiation into Saivism, the predominant religious denomination of Kashmir, but the Devasmamin (the priest) felt him to be unworthy. He does not discuss the religious aspects of Rinchan any further but given the Islamic names of his son, it is obvious that he had converted to Islam sometime later. According to BIS, Rinchan was terribly confused about his religious conversion, with both Hindus and Muslims beseeching him to join their faith to the extent of engaging in theological debates. Eventually, one morning he saw Bulbul Shah—a Turkistani Sufi missionary of the Ni'matullah Order—and was taken in by his devotion as well as preaching; thus, he became the first ruler of Kashmir to embrace Islam.

In the meanwhile, Udayandeva—a member of the erstwhile nobility, who had fled to Gandhara on the heels of a failed negotiation with Qadr—scoped for opportunities to usurp the throne. He is said to have instigated Takka, whose brother Timi was earlier executed by Rinchan for having drank stolen milk, into a rebellion; Udayandeva particularly emphasized how Rinchan cared about nothing but fame and how Takka was kept in the sidelines of Rinchan's administration unlike Vyala.

Subsequently, Rinchan was sworded in the royal palace and the conspirators, taking him for dead, planned to seize the city. In reality, Rinchan was seriously injured but not dead; he stood up once they were at a distance. Despite spotting this, no one bothered to have him overpowered but fought among themselves about who was to blame for not pulling off the assassination. Eventually, Rinchan staked the assassins and massacred their families to the extent of disemboweling pregnant women. The rebellion was suppressed ruthlessly but the injuries inflicted a chronic headache.

Art and Architecture 
Rinchan built a khanqah in Shah's honor near his palace and even commissioned a jagir. He also constructed the Baed Masheed (lit. Big Mosque). Jonaraja also constructed the fortification of Rinchanpora.

Death and heir 
The winters of 1323 worsened Rinchan's headache; he never recovered and breathed his last on 25 November. His remains remain interred near Bud Masheed — the tomb was discovered by archaeologist A. H. Francke in 1909 and reconstructed by Kashmiri Government in 1990. He had a son, Haidar Khan, by his queen Kota, whom he entrusted to the care of Shah Mir.

Mir would later kill Haider along with Rani, establishing the Shah Mir dynasty.

Notes

References 

1323 deaths
Converts to Islam from Buddhism
14th-century rulers in Asia
Ladakhi people
Medieval India
People from Ladakh
Sultans of Kashmir